Fiorella Chiappe y Madsen (born 1 January 1996, Barcelona, Spain) is an Argentine athlete specialising in the 400 metres hurdles. She won the gold medal in the 400 metres hurdles at the 2018 South American Games and holds the national record of 56.08. Previously she competed in the heptathlon winning, among others, a silver medal at the 2014 South American Games.

International competitions

Personal bests
Outdoor
200 metres – 24.89 (-0.1 m/s, Rio de Janeiro 2016)
400 metres – 53.98 (Concepción del Uruguay 2018)
800 metres – 2:13.63 (Santiago de Chile 2014)
100 metres hurdles – 13.72 (+0.2 m/s, Buenos Aires 2017)
400 metres hurdles – 55.88 (Bruxelles Belgium 2018)
High jump – 1.76 (Buenos Aires 2017)
Long jump – 6.25 (+0.5 m/s, Buenos Aires 2017)
Shot put – 11.33 (Buenos Aires 2017)
Javelin throw – 35.98 (Santiago de Chile 2014)
Heptathlon – 5815 (Buenos Aires 2017)

References

1996 births
Living people
Argentine female hurdlers
Argentine heptathletes
Athletes (track and field) at the 2015 Pan American Games
Athletes (track and field) at the 2019 Pan American Games
Pan American Games competitors for Argentina
Athletes (track and field) at the 2018 South American Games
South American Games gold medalists for Argentina
South American Games silver medalists for Argentina
South American Games bronze medalists for Argentina
South American Games medalists in athletics
Competitors at the 2017 Summer Universiade
Ibero-American Championships in Athletics winners
South American Games gold medalists in athletics